The Fort Worth Texans were a professional ice hockey team based in Fort Worth, Texas. They started play in 1967 as the Fort Worth Wings, a minor league affiliate for the Detroit Red Wings.  They were part of the Central Hockey League and played their home games at Will Rogers Coliseum. The team won their only Adams Cup Championship, in 1978 by defeating their arch rival Dallas Black Hawks 5–4 in overtime of game seven of the finals.

History
Beginning play in 1967, the Fort Worth Wings were a force to be reckoned with. The newest team in the Central Professional Hockey League was led by Rick McCann who scored 71 points and helped propel the Wings into the playoffs. They eventually lost in the finals. They continued to remain competitive in the following seasons, only missing the playoffs once between 1968 and 1974. In 1972, the Wings shared roster spots on the team with the St. Louis Blues due to money constraints and finally disbanded the team the following season. However a new club bought the rights to the team and from 1973 to 1978 they were a farm team of the New York Islanders (with some players held for Minnesota and Los Angeles). They won the Adams cup in 1978 with the help of Richie Hansen and future NHLer Gary Smith. The team was again sold to the late Dick Andersen in 1979 to 1982, they were a farm team of the Colorado Rockies. After the 1981-82 season, the Texans, along with the Dallas Black Hawks and Oklahoma City Stars, left the Central Hockey League. Seeing as these were the most popular teams, the move greatly affected overall attendance and the league folded after the 1983–84 season.

Trivia
The "Rock and Roll" song (the actual name of the song is "Rock and Roll Part 2"), also known as "The Hey Song", a song performed by British glam rocker Gary Glitter that was released in 1972 as a single and on the album Glitter, was played in the late 1970s when the Texans came onto the ice at the start of every period.  It was also used by the Colorado Rockies and became their theme song, before it later spread around the country.

The Texans were the only professional team to beat the 1980 USA Hockey "Miracle on Ice" Olympic team twice during the Pre-Olympic tour, winning on Jan 16, 1980, 4–3 at a sold-out Will Rogers Coliseum and then 5–3 nine days later at the Met Center in Bloomington, MN. All the CHL teams played a round-robin with the Olympic team that season, with one game at home and one game in Bloomington. The games against the USA hockey team were very important to the CHL teams as they counted in the standings. The USA Olympic team finished 14–3–1 against the CHL teams. The Texans surprisingly finished 37–34–3 and reached the finals of the 1979–80 Adams Cup, losing in seven games to the Salt Lake City Golden Eagles.

One game featured, as part of their intermission entertainment, a short exhibition hockey game between girls from the Dallas Playboy club and airmen stationed at Carswell Air Force Base in Fort Worth. The Airmen shared the ice with the Texans for a practice in the week leading up to the game. A team of local college players helped the girls. They advertised in the local papers with the slogan "War on Ice".

The Fort Worth Wings/Texans and the Dallas Black Hawks maintained one of the most intense and storied rivalries in all sports history, featuring several bench clearing brawls. Fort Worth, during the 1978 championship campaign, featured stickers and buttons that read "BEAT dallas" as well as hosting the Blackhawks for a 10 cent beer night that became a near riot. The rivalry between the Wings/Texans and the Blackhawks also made them two of the most popular teams in the CHL.

Head coaches
The head coaches of the franchise include Fern Flaman, Doug Barkley, Bob Lemieux, Johnny Choyce, Ed Chadwick, Terry Gray, Billy MacMillan, Ron Ullyot, and Andy Laing.

References

External links
 Fort Worth Wings (1967-68) on Hockey Database.com
 Fort Worth Wings (1968-74) on Hockey Database.com
 Fort Worth Texans on Hockey Database.com

Ice hockey clubs established in 1967
Ice hockey clubs disestablished in 1982
Defunct Central Hockey League teams
Ice hockey teams in the Dallas–Fort Worth metroplex
Defunct ice hockey teams in Texas
Central Professional Hockey League teams
1967 establishments in Texas
1982 disestablishments in Texas
Detroit Red Wings minor league affiliates
St. Louis Blues minor league affiliates
New York Islanders minor league affiliates
Los Angeles Kings minor league affiliates
Minnesota North Stars minor league affiliates
Colorado Rockies (NHL) minor league affiliates